Ranella olearium, common name the wandering triton or the little frog triton or olive trumpet, is a species of large sea snail, a marine gastropod mollusc in the family Ranellidae, the tritons.

Synonyms
Over the course of time, this species has been named many times:

 Argobuccinum dilleri Anderson, F.M. & B. Martin, 1914
 Argobuccinum giganteum curvicauda (f) Coen, G.S., 1941
 Argobuccinum giganteum dilatata (f) Coen, G.S., 1941
 Argobuccinum giganteum duplonodosum Settepassi, F., 1970
 Argobuccinum giganteum exile (f) Settepassi, F., 1970
 Argobuccinum giganteum inflatum Settepassi, F., 1970
 Argobuccinum giganteum intusdentata (f) Coen, G.S., 1941
 Argobuccinum giganteum magnifica (f) Coen, G.S., 1941
 Argobuccinum giganteum nodosecarinata (f) Coen, G.S., 1941
 Argobuccinum giganteum nodosum Settepassi, F., 1970
 Argobuccinum giganteum oceanica (f) Coen, G.S., 1941
 Argobuccinum giganteum rarituberculatum Settepassi, F., 1970
 Argobuccinum giganteum tenuis (f) Coen, G.S., 1941
 Argobuccinum pertuberculiferum Bellardi, L. in Sacco, F., 1872
 Bursa barcellosi Matthews, Rios & Coelho, 1973
 Cymatium olearium Linnaeus
 Gyrina maculata Schumacher, 1817
 Mayena multinodosa Bucknill, 1927
 Murex olearium Linnaeus, 1758 (basionym)
 Murex boveus Risso, A., 1826
 Murex reticularis Born, 1780
 Ranella bronni Michelotti, O.G., 1847
 Ranella budensis Noszky, 1940
 Ranella gigantea Lamarck, 1816
 Ranella incerta Michelotti, O.G., 1847
 Ranella miocenica Michelotti, O.G., 1847
 Ranella multinodosa Bucknill, 1927
 Ranella olearia (Linnaeus, 1758)
 Ranella ostenfeldi Iredale, 1937
 Ranella ranina Lamarck, J.B.P.A. de, 1816
 Ranella rarinodosa Noszky, 1940
 Ranella reticularis altavillensis (f) Gregorio, A. de, 1884
 Ranella reticularis bicanalata (f) Gregorio, A. de, 1884
 Ranella reticularis borniana (f) Gregorio, A. de, 1884
 Ranella reticularis frigida (f) Gregorio, A. de, 1884
 Ranella reticularis mediterranea (f) Gregorio, A. de, 1884
 Ranella reticularis meneghini (f) Gregorio, A. de, 1884
 Ranella reticularis parivaricata (f) Gregorio, A. de, 1884
 Ranella reticularis isba (f) Gregorio, A. de, 1885
 Ranella semilaevis Noszky, 1940
 Ranella simplex Noszky, 1940
 Triton parmense Sismonda, E., 1842

Distribution
This species has a wide distribution. It is found in European waters, in the Mediterranean Sea, in the Central and South Atlantic Ocean (Cape Verde, West Africa), in the Indian Ocean (Mozambique, South Africa), along New Zealand, in the Caribbean Sea (along Colombia) and in the South Western Pacific (not in Galápagos) .

Description 
The shell size of Ranella olearium varies between 90 mm and 240 mm. It is a highly variable species. Usually these large shells are elongated, thick and sturdy, with rounded whorls and with tubercles more or less developed on some sutures. The mouth is large and has a rounded section. The siphonal channel is moderately long and the lip bears many teeth, often double, arranged along the polished, white or brown edge. The external surface of the shell is brown ocher, with clearer tubercles and other protruding parts. The inner surface and the columella are white.  In the living individual the shell is commonly covered with an outer velvety layer.

Habitat 
These outer shelf-upper bathyal sea snails live on sandy or muddy bottoms. They have been recorded at a minimum depth of 100 m. and at a maximum depth of about 280 m.

References

Further reading 
 Powell A W B, New Zealand Mollusca, William Collins Publishers Ltd, Auckland, New Zealand 1979 
 Gofas, S.; Le Renard, J.; Bouchet, P. (2001). Mollusca. in: Costello, M.J. et al. (Ed.) (2001). European register of marine species: a check-list of the marine species in Europe and a bibliography of guides to their identification. Collection Patrimoines Naturels. 50: pp. 180–213.
 MacNae, W. & M. Kalk (eds) (1958). A natural history of Inhaca Island, Mozambique. Witwatersrand Univ. Press, Johannesburg. I-iv, 163 pp.
 NZIB: New Zealand Inventory of Biodiversity. Gordon D. (ed), 2009-06-12

External links
  Serge GOFAS, Ángel A. LUQUE, Joan Daniel OLIVER,José TEMPLADO & Alberto SERRA (2021) - The Mollusca of Galicia Bank (NE Atlantic Ocean); European Journal of Taxonomy 785: 1–114

Ranellidae
Taxa named by Carl Linnaeus
Gastropods described in 1758